Happy Accidents is a British pop punk band based in London, consisting of Rich Mandell (guitar and vocals) and Phoebe Cross (drums and vocals).

History
Happy Accidents was formed in Southampton in 2013 by siblings Neil (bass) and Rich Mandell (guitar and vocals), and Phoebe Cross (drums and vocals).

After releasing an EP and a split 7-inch on Don't Ask Records in 2014, and relocating to London, the band signed to Alcopop! Records and released their debut album You Might Be Right on 1 July 2016.

Their second LP Everything But The Here and Now was released on 16 February 2018, also by Alcopop! Records. It was recorded with Matthew "MJ" Johnson of Hookworms at his studio Suburban Home.

Neil Mandell left the band amicably in 2019, to focus on other things. The band have continued as a duo.

The third Happy Accidents album, Sprawling, was released on 29 May 2020. It was self-produced, and released on vinyl and digital download by the band, without a label, via Bandcamp.com.

Happy Accidents announced in May 2021 that they would cease to play and tour as a live band, but that they might still record and release new material. Both Mandell and Cross are currently members of Me Rex, and Cross is also a member of Cheerbleederz.

Discography

Albums
You Might Be Right - Alcopop! Records, 12-inch LP, CD, MP3 (2016)
Everything But The Here and Now - Alcopop! Records, 12-inch LP, CD, MP3 (2018)
Sprawling - Self released, 12-inch LP, download (2020)

EPS
Not Yet Jaded - Don't Ask Records, Cassette, MP3 (2014)

Split releases
Split with Austeros, Isaac, Young Attenborough - Don't Ask Records, 7-inch, MP3 (2014)

References

Underground punk scene in the United Kingdom
Musical groups established in 2013
English indie rock groups
English pop punk groups
2013 establishments in England
Alcopop! Records artists